Last Dance or The Last Dance may refer to:

Books
The Last Dance, the fiftieth 87th Precinct novel by Ed McBain
The Last Dance, period novel by Paul Charles

Film and television
 The Last Dance (1930 film), an American drama film starring Fred Walton
 The Last Dance (1941 film), an Italian film directed by Camillo Mastrocinque
 Daibyonin (also known as The Last Dance), a 1993 Japanese film by Juzo Itami
 Sista dansen (The Last Dance), a 1993 Swedish-language film
 Last Dance (1996 film), starring Sharon Stone
 Last Dance (1998 film), or The Hole, a Taiwanese film by Tsai Ming-liang
 Last Dance (2002 film), a documentary featuring the Pilobolus dance company
 Last Dance (2012 film), an Australian film
 The Last Dance (miniseries), a 2020 basketball documentary series about Michael Jordan and the 1997–98 Chicago Bulls season
 "Last Dance" (Flashpoint), an episode of Flashpoint
 "The Last Dance" (The Vampire Diaries), an episode of the television series The Vampire Diaries
 Magic Mike's Last Dance, to be released on February 10, 2023, by Steven Soderbergh

Music
 Last Dance (band), a band that recorded for record label 4AD
 The Last Dance (band), a darkwave rock band

Albums
Last Dance, by Rosie (band) 1977 
 Last Dance, a 1995 album by Jason Rebello
 Last Dance (album), a 2014 album by Keith Jarret and Charlie Haden
 The Last Dance (Magnum album), 1996
 The Last Dance (Spice 1 album), 2000
 The Last Dance (Steps album), 2002
 The Last Dance (40 Below Summer album), 2006
 The Last Dance (EP), a 1993 EP by Disco Inferno, or the title song

Songs
 "Last Dance" (Donna Summer song), 1978
 "The Last Dance" (song), a 2011 song by Clare Maguire
 "Last Dance" (Big Bang song), 2016
 "Last Dance" (Dua Lipa song), 2016
 "Last Dance" (Stefania song), 2021
 "Last Dance" ((G)I-dle song), 2021
 "Last Dance", a 1973 song by Neil Young from Time Fades Away
 "Last Dance", a 1977 song by Chuck Mangione from Feels So Good
 "Last Dance", a 1983 song by George Clinton from You Shouldn't-Nuf Bit Fish
 "Last Dance", a 1985 song by The Mekons from Fear and Whiskey
 "Last Dance", a 1989 song by The Cure from Disintegration
 "Last Dance", a 1999 song by Brian McKnight from Back at One
 "Last Dance", a 2016 song by Steve Angello from Wild Youth
 "The Last Dance", a 2007 song by The Tough Alliance from A New Chance
 "The Last Dance", a song written by Jimmy Van Heusen and Sammy Cahn

See also 
 One Last Dance (disambiguation)